Parornix polygrammella is a moth of the family Gracillariidae. It is known from Fennoscandia, Estonia, northern Russia and France.

The larvae feed on Betula nana. They mine the leaves of their host plant. The mine consists of a small, lower-surface, tentiform mine. After the larva has left the mine, it folds a leaf downwards over the midrib and consumes it up to the epidermis.

References

Parornix
Moths of Europe
Moths described in 1862